Roll Bounce is a 2005 American comedy-drama film written by Norman Vance Jr. and directed by Malcolm D. Lee. The film stars hip hop artist Bow Wow as the leader of a roller skating crew in 1970s Chicago. The film also stars Nick Cannon, Meagan Good, Brandon T. Jackson, Wesley Jonathan, Chi McBride, Kellita Smith, Jurnee Smollett and Mike Epps. The name of the film is derived from the 1979 song "Bounce, Rock, Skate, Roll" by Vaughan Mason & Crew.

Plot
In 1978 Chicago, after the local roller rink the "Palisade Garden" closes down, 16-year-old Xavier "X" Smith and his friends Junior, Boo, Naps, along with his new neighbor Tori, spend their summer roller skating in the ritzy uptown rink "Sweetwater" where they are disrespected by the five-year roller disco contest champions, Sweetness and his crew, the Sweetwater Rollers. They enter the contest themselves to earn their place at the rink. Xavier reconnects with an old crush Naomi.

Xavier's home life is strained after the death of his mother, leaving his father Curtis struggling to take care of Xavier and his sister Sonya while restoring his late wife's car. Curtis finds Xavier's skating a waste of time and prefers him to be at home taking care of chores. Unbeknownst to Xavier and Sonya, Curtis lost his job as an aerospace engineer and has had to take a job as a janitor. Curtis connects with Tori's mother Vivian, who was initially hostile for Curtis taking Tori to the roller rink with Xavier without Vivian's permission. Xavier learns about his father's unemployment when he finds his car for sale and confronts him. Xavier smashes the windows of his late mother's car in a rage, before both he and Curtis break down in tears. Xavier also wrongfully lashes out at Naomi. Following days of not paying attention to his father, Xavier opens a package addressed to Curtis, which are a pair of new skates for Xavier. His current skates, a gift from his mother, have begun to break down. Curtis explains he was hurting so much from his wife's death that he neglected Xavier and Sonya, and he promises to be a more attentive father. He makes amends with Naomi as well.

At the skating competition Xavier and his team "the Garden Boys" are set to go last so the Sweetwater Rollers can steal their original song choice "Le Freak". Naps finds "Hollywood Swinging" is a suitable replacement song. For the first time in the history of the competition, the Sweetwater Rollers tie for first place with another team, the Garden Boys. Sweetness challenges Xavier to a one-on-one skate-off with no falls. Xavier throws out every move he knows and is set to win when he attempts a triple Lutz jump, but falls and loses the competition. He does, however, earn the respect of Sweetness and the audience. Xavier and Naomi share a kiss, while Junior shares one with Tori, whom he had ridiculed for having braces before she had them removed. Everyone skates together.

Cast

Reception
Roll Bounce received mixed to positive reviews from critics. , the film holds a 66% approval rating on Rotten Tomatoes, based on 90 reviews with an average rating of 6.00/10. The website's critics consensus reads: "Roll Bounce dazzles us with a classic late 1970's feel, but this coming of age film could have been more than just a spin around the roller rink."

Soundtrack

Roll Bounce: The Album was released on September 20, 2005, by Sanctuary Urban Records Group.

Overview
The soundtrack features artists such as Keith Sweat, Foxy, Chaka Khan, Beyoncé, Earth, Wind & Fire, Fabolous, Yo-Yo, Michelle Williams, Bill Withers, Chic, Jamiroquai, Kool & the Gang and Vaughan Mason & Crew.

Other songs in the film include
 "Flash Light" - Parliament
 "Emotion" - Samantha Sang
 "Can You Feel the Force?" - The Real Thing
 "Love to Love You Baby" - Donna Summer
 "I'll Keep Loving You" - Carl Douglas
 "Barracuda" - Heart
 "Rock the Boat" - The Hues Corporation
 "Baby Hold On" - Eddie Money
 "On the Beautiful Blue Danube" - Royal Philharmonic Orchestra
 "Kung Fu Fighting" - Carl Douglas
 "I'm Your Boogie Man" - KC and the Sunshine Band
 "Let's Roll" - Chaka Khan
 "Easy" - Commodores
 "For All We Know" - Donny Hathaway
 "Boogie Fever" - The Sylvers
 "Pick Up the Pieces" - Average White Band
 "Fire" - Ohio Players
 "He's the Greatest Dancer" - Sister Sledge
 "Baby Come Back" - Player

Awards and nominations

See also

References

External links
 
 
 
 
 
 

2005 films
2005 romantic comedy-drama films
2000s sports comedy-drama films
2000s teen comedy-drama films
African-American films
American coming-of-age comedy-drama films
American romantic comedy-drama films
American teen comedy-drama films
American teen romance films
2000s English-language films
Fox Searchlight Pictures films
Films scored by Stanley Clarke
Films directed by Malcolm D. Lee
Films produced by Robert Teitel
Films set in the 1970s
Films set in 1978
Films set in Chicago
Roller skating films
2005 comedy films
2005 drama films
2000s American films